Anatrachyntis cyma is a moth in the family Cosmopterigidae. It was described by John David Bradley in 1953 and is known from Fiji.

This species has a wingspan of 15–18 mm.

The forewings are ochreous with pale ochreous and brownish wave-like markings, basal third is brown, outer edge outwardly oblique and outlined with black. A whitish-ochreous streak from base below costa and parallel to it.

Biology
This species feeds on the flowers of Pandanus species.

References

Anatrachyntis
Moths of Fiji
Moths described in 1953